The following is a list of renamed cities and municipalities in the Philippines.

Luzon
Adan → Adams
Alava → Sison
Albay → Legaspi (1925) → Legazpi
Anderson →Garchitorena (1949) 
Angaki → Quirino (1964)
Angio → San Fabian

Antatet → Luna (1951)
Atoc → Atok
Aurora → San Francisco (1967)
Azagra → San Fernando
Bacuit → El Nido (1954)
Badajoz → San Agustin (1957)
Bacnotan → Dagupan
Bagnotan → Bacnotan
Bailen → General Emilio Aguinaldo (1965) → Bailen (2012; never ratified in a plebiscite)
Balincaguin → Mabini (1929)
Baliuag → Baliwag
Banna → Espiritu (1964) → Banna (1995)
Baoang → Bauang
Bauguen → Salcedo (1957)
Bayag → Calanasan (1967)
Bigaa → Balagtas (1966)
Biñangonan → Binangonan 
Binangonan de Lampon → Infanta (1902)
Bitulok → Sabani (1953) → Gabaldon (1955)
Budiao → Cagsaua → Daraga → Locsin (1959) → Daraga (1967)
Bulaoen → Alava → Sison (1918)
Buenavista → Bataan → San Andres, Bataan (1945)
Busaingan → Santa Magdalena
Cabayan → Kabayan
Caboan → San Miguel de Caboan → Santa Maria de Caboan → Santa Maria
Cabugaoan → Kabugao
Callang → San Manuel (1965)
Calolbon → San Andres (1964)
Caloocan → Kalookan → Caloocan
Capangan → Kapangan
Carig → Santiago de Carig → Santiago (1910)
Cava → Caba
Cavite El Viejo → Cavite Viejo → Kawit (1907)
Cavite La Punta → Cavite Nuevo → Cavite (1903)
Cayan → Kayan → Tadian (1959)
Cayapa → Kayapa
Concepcion → Gregorio del Pilar (1955)
Culiat → Angeles (1829)
Despujols → San Andres (1961)
Disdis → Burgos (1925)
Echagüe → Echague
Estella → Cordon
Faire → Santo Niño (1969)
Guiling-guiling → Siniloan
Hingoso → General Luna
Ibung → Villaverde (1959)
Imelda → San Lorenzo Ruiz (1989)
Imelda → Santa Maria (1988)
Indan → Vinzons (1945)
Irirun → Calintaan
Jimoto → Gigmoto
Jones → Banton (1959)
Jose Panganiban → Payo (1957) → Panganiban (1959)
Kalamba → Calamba, Laguna
Laguimanoc → Padre Burgos
Langangan → Santa Praxedes (1964)
Lapog → San Juan (1961)
Las Peñas → Las Piñas
Libog → Santo Domingo (1959)
Lilio → Liliw
Limbuhan → Pio V. Corpuz (1954)
Linapacan → Gaudencio E. Abordo (1988) → Linapacan
Liwan → Rizal (1971)
Llana Hermosa → Hermosa
Longos → Kalayaan (1956)
Mabatobato → Ocampo (1949)
Magalan → Magalang
Magallanes → Magdiwang
Magsaysay → Delfin Albano (1982)
Malabanan → Biñan
Mambulao → Jose Panganiban (1934)
Mangarin →San Jose
Marcos → Dr. Jose P. Rizal (1988) → Rizal
Mariquina → Marikina (1901)
Mauanan → Rizal (1914)
Mendez Nuñez → Mendez
Montalban → Rodriguez (1982)
Montufar → Prieto Diaz
Moron → Morong (1955)
Nagpartian → Burgos (1914)
Namacpacan → Luna (1906)
Nueva Caceres → Naga (1919)
Nueva Coveta → Burgos
Nueva Segovia → Lal-lo
Olongapo → President Magsaysay City (1971) → Olongapo
Papaya → General Tinio (1957)
Paquil → Pakil
Parubcan → Presentacion (1969)
Patoc → Alfonso XII → Patoc → Peñarrubia (1903)
Perez Dasmariñas → Dasmariñas (1917)
Peris → Piris → Buenavista
Pinagsangahan → Pagsanjan (1688)
Pineda → Pasay (1901) → Rizal City (1947) → Pasay (1950)
Polo → Valenzuela (1963)
Potia → Lista (1988) → Alfonso Lista
Principe Alfonso → Balabac
Puerto De La Princesa (1863) → Puerto Princesa
Puerto Real → Real
Quiangan → Kiangan
Quibungan → Kibungan
Quingua → Plaridel (1936)
Quipia → Jovellar (1882)
Salasa → Bugallon (1921)
San Bartolome de Calayan → Calayan
San Carlos de Marigatao → Mahatao
San Felipe Neri → Mandaluyong (1931)
San Francisco de Malabon → General Trias (1920)
San Isidro de Potot → Burgos (1913)
San Isidro Labrador → Labrador (1939)
San Jose de Casignan → Maria Aurora
San Jose de Ivana → Ivana
San Jose de Manabo → Manabo
San Jose de Navotas → Navotas
San Juan de Bocboc → San Juan de Bolboc → Bolbok → San Juan
San Juan de Dinalupijan → Dinalupihan
San Juan de Guimba → Guimba
San Juan del Monte → San Juan
San Miguel → Sarrat (1916)
San Miguel de Camiling → Camiling
San Miguel de Masantol → Masantol (1907)
San Miguel de Mayumo → San Miguel
San Pablo de los Montes → San Pablo (1902)
San Pedro → Bulalacao (1969)
San Pedro de Macati → Makati (1914)
San Pedro de Tunasan → San Pedro (1914)
San Vicente de Dasol → Dasol (1903)
San Vicente de Sabtan → Sabtang
Santa Catalina de Baba → Santa
San Pedro de Macati → Makati
Santa Catalina Virgen y Martir (V. y M.) → Santa Catalina
Santa Cruz de Malabon → Tanza (1914)
Santa Cruz de Mindoro → Santa Cruz
Santa Cruz de Napo → Santa Cruz
Santa Florentina → Rapu-Rapu
Santa Maria de Mayan → Mayan → Itbayat
Santa Maria de Pandi → Santa Maria
Santa Rosa de Lima → Santa Rosa
Santo Domingo de Basco → Basco
Santor → Bongabon
Sexmoan → Sasmuan (1991)
Sin-nait → Sinait
Subaan → San Teodoro
Tabuco → Kabuyaw → Cabuyao (1571)
Tambobon → Malabon
Tauit → Tawit → Pudtol
Tejeros → Salinas → Rosario (1846)
Tivi → Tiwi
Udyong → Orion
Villavieja → Villa-Pilar (1903) → Pilar
Wawa → Guagua

Visayas

Almeria → Kawayan (1907)
Antique → Hamtic
Arguelles → Magallanes → Sagay (1906)
Asia → Hinoba-an (1959)
Ayuquitan → Amlan (1950)
Badiang → Carles (1862) 
Bangajon → Gandara
Balud → Minglanilla (1858)
Batuanan → Alicia (1949)
Binuntuan → Las Navas
Borja → Sagbayan (1957)
Bugho → Javier (1965)
Cabalian → San Juan (1961)
Calivo → Kalibo
Canoan → Larena
Capiz → Roxas (1951)
Cavancalan → Kabankalan (1907)
Cordoba → Cordova
Dao → Tobias Fornier (1978)
Ginigaran → Hinigaran
Guijulungan → Guijulugan → Guihulngan
Hibatang → Calbayog
Ipil → Trinidad (1947)
Jimamailan → Himamaylan
Jimeno → Altavas
La Granja → Allen (1903)
Lacy → Lazi
Lagatic → New Washington
Laguan → Laoang
Lanang → Llorente (1903)
Lauaan → Lawaan
Lucena → New Lucena (1955)
Lutod-lutod → President Roxas
Taft → Makato
Magallon → Moises Padilla (1957)
Magsohong → Santa Margarita (1892)
Malabooch → Malabohoc → Dunggoan → Maribojoc
Mariveles → Dauis
Minuluan → Talisay
Nagaba → Jordan (1902)
Nalupa Nuevo → Barboza → Barbaza
Navas → Nabas (1906)
Nueva Valencia → Luzurriaga → Valencia (1948)
Opon → Lapu-Lapu (1961)
Paranas → Wright → Paranas (1988)
Payabon → Bindoy (1959)
Pinabagdao → Pinabacdao
Pitogo → President Carlos P. Garcia (1977)
Quiot → Isabel
San Isidro de Campo → San Isidro
San Jacinto → Catigbian (1954)
San Juan de Ilog → Ilog
San Ricardo → Pintuyan (1907)
Saravia → Enrique B. Magalona (1967)
Tierra Alta → Lezo
Tolon → Tolon Nuevo → New Tolong → Bayawan (1952)
Santo Niño and San Jose → Tacloban (1950)
Tubig → Taft (1903)
Vilar → Bilar

Mindanao

Albor → Libjo (1967)
Anao-aon → San Francisco (1971)
Bacolod Grande → Bacolod-Kalawi (1994)
Bacungan → Leon B. Postigo (1989)
Balimbing → Panglima Sugala (1991)
Boayen → Buayan → Dadiangas → General Santos (1954)
Cabuntog → General Luna (1929)
Cagayan de Misamis → Cagayan →  Cagayan de Oro (1950)
Cagayan de Sulu → Cagayan de Tawi-Tawi (1984) → Mapun (1988)
Dansalan → Marawi (1956)
Dinaig → Datu Odin Sinsuat
Dipag → Dipolog (1913)
Don Mariano Marcos → Don Victoriano (1990) → Don Victoriano Chiongbian
Don Mariano Marcos → Sominot (1988)
Doña Alicia → Mabini (1954)
Dulawan → Datu Piang (1954)
Hagpa → San Francisco, Agusan del Sur (1955) 
Jinatuan → Hinatuan
Karomatan → Sultan Naga Dimaporo
Lambayong → Sultan sa Barongis (1959)
Liargo → Ramon Magsaysay
Linamon → Tomas Cabili (1983) → Linamon
Linguig → Lingig
Linugas → Magsaysay (1957)
Lubungan → Katipunan (1936)
Maganoy → Shariff Aguak
Magugpo → Tagum
Maluko → Manolo Fortich (1957)
Marbel → Koronadal
Mariano Marcos → Lambayong (1988)
Marungas → Hadji Panglima Tahil
Mina-ano → Remedios T. Romualdez
Misamis → Ozamiz (1948)
New Leyte → Maco
New Panamao → Panglima Estino
New Piñan → Piñan (1960)
Nueva Vergara → Davao (1868)
Nuling → Sultan Kudarat (1969)
Numancia → Del Carmen (1966)
Oteiza → Marihatag (1955)
Pagagawan →Datu Montawal (2003)
Pandami → Lapak (1992) → Pandami
Ponot → Jose Dalman (1983)
Quinoguitan → Kinoguitan
Regidor → Tangub (1930)
Rizal → Basilisa (1969)
San Mariano → Maragusan (1988)
San Vicente → Laak (1994)
Sapao → Santa Monica (1967)
Saug → Asuncion (1957)
Sigaboy → Governor Generoso
Sultan Gumander → Picong (2006)
Taganak → Turtle Islands
Talipao → Arolas Tulawie (1984) → Talipao
Talitay →Sultan Sumagka (2008)
Tatarikan → Pagayawan
Tongkil → Banguingui
Trinidad → Jose Abad Santos (1955)
Tumbao → Kabuntalan (1976)
Wato → Balindong

See also
List of cities in the Philippines
Municipalities of the Philippines

References

Philippines
Lists of cities in the Philippines
Lists of municipalities of the Philippines
Cities and municipalities, renamed